Aegiphila monticola is a species of tree in the family Lamiaceae. It is endemic to Ecuador, where it is known from Cotopaxi and Bolívar Provinces. There are about eight populations.

The tree occurs at altitude in the Andes, where it grows in páramo and cloud forest habitat. It also takes hold in disturbed areas, such as roadsides.

References

monticola
Endemic flora of Ecuador
Endangered plants
Páramo flora
Taxonomy articles created by Polbot